Bal Jagannath Pandit (24 July 1929 – 17 September 2015) was an Indian cricketer, writer and broadcaster.

Early life
He was born in Pune. He was a right-handed batsman who played for Maharashtra.

Playing career
Pandit made his cricketing debut in the Rohinton Baria Trophy, in which he played for Poona University for two seasons between 1951 and 1953. He made a single first-class appearance, during the 1959–60 season, representing Maharashtra against Gujarat in the Ranji Trophy. In the only innings in which he batted, he scored 25 runs.

Later career
Pandit was a pioneer in Marathi cricket commentary and was commissioned by All India Radio for many decades. His coining of new words in Marathi for cricket terms such as ‘aapat-baar’ for a bouncer ball received wide popularity. He was also  a cricket commentator in English for a short period. Being a first-class cricketer himself, Pandit's commentary was clinical. He was known for focusing on the scope of improvement in a player in his commentary. His achievements in live commentary for 40 years was also noticed by the Limca Book of World Records

Bal Pandit was the secretary of Maharashtra Cricket Association (MCA) in the mid-1980s. He was also the President of Maharashtra Cricket Association. He played a vital role in the selection committee of the organisation.

Pandit was also a Trustee of the Dnyaneshwar Maharaj Samadhi temple complex in Alandi from 1966 to 1999.

Books
Pandit was also a prolific cricket writer and wrote 35 books. He authored several columns in newspapers and magazines, striking a chord with common people and enhancing their knowledge with illustrations. His translation of Sunil Gavaskar’s book Sunny Days in Marathi became immensely popular. He authored a number of books in Marathi.

 Sunny Days (translation in Marathi)
 The Little Master
 Prakrami Daura
 Ase Samane Ase Kheladu
 Athawanitil Vyakti Ani Prasang
 Cricketmadhil Navalkatha
  Cricket Tantra Ani Mantra
 “ Lokmanyancha Manasputra"

Awards
The Maharashtra government recognized him with the Shiv Chhatrapati Sports award in 1978.

Death
Bal Pandit died due to prolonged illness on the afternoon of 17 September 2015.

References

External links

1929 births
2015 deaths
Indian cricketers
Maharashtra cricketers
Cricketers from Pune